= Sarla Bhadauria =

Indian politician

Member of Parliament, Rajya Sabha
- In office 1964–1970
- Constituency: Uttar Pradesh

Personal details
- Born: 1921
- Died: 19 March 2006
- Party: Samyukta Socialist Party

Sarla Bhadauria (1921-2006) was an Indian politician. She was a Member of Parliament, representing Uttar Pradesh in the Rajya Sabha the upper house of India's Parliament as a member of the Samyukta Socialist Party.
